The Krefeld tramway network is a network of tramways forming part of the public transport system in Krefeld, a city in the federal state of North Rhine-Westphalia, Germany.  Opened in 1883, the network has been operated since 2002 by SWK MOBIL, and is integrated in the Verkehrsverbund Rhein-Ruhr (VRR).

Lines 
, the Krefeld tramway network had four lines, operating in Krefeld and St.Tönis.

All of these lines, along with lines U70 and U76 of the Düsseldorf-Krefeld Stadtbahn, run through the centre of Krefeld, on a combined double track route via Ostwall, using four rails per track (two of them metre gauge, and the other two standard gauge).

Tram lines (as of June 2013)

In the evenings, all tram lines run to about 24:00, and in the early hours of Saturdays and Sundays, lines 041, 042 and 044 continue running until 03:30.

Düsseldorf Stadtbahn lines (as of January 2013)

See also
List of town tramway systems in Germany
Trams in Germany

References

External links

 
 

Krefeld
Krefeld
Transport in North Rhine-Westphalia
Metre gauge railways in Germany
750 V DC railway electrification
Krefeld